The IFFHS World's Best Player is a football award given annually from 1988 to 1990, and since 2020, to the world's best player. The award is given by the International Federation of Football History & Statistics (IFFHS).

Men's winners

List of winners 
From 1991 until 2009, FIFA continued this distinction named "FIFA World Player of the Year"; this award was later replaced by the FIFA Ballon d'Or in 2010, and The Best FIFA Men's Player in 2016.

Statistics

Continental winners 
 Bold indicates the World's Best Man Player winner.

The World's Best Man Player of the Century (1901–2000)

The Best Man Player of the Decade (2011–2020)

The Best European Player (1956–1990) 

On 24 April 1990, before the 1990 FIFA World Cup, IFFHS gave out an award for the best European player taking into consideration players who were voted in the shortlist of the France Football's Ballon d'Or from 1956 until 1989.

Men Legends

Women's winners

List of winners

Statistics

Continental rankings 

 Bold indicates the World's Best Woman Player winner.

The World's Best Woman Player of the Century (1901–2000) 

IFFHS gave out an award decided by votes which was conducted with the participation of journalists and former players (no further details given).

The Best Woman Player of the Decade (2011–2020)

Women Legends

See also 
International Federation of Football History & Statistics
IFFHS World's Best Club
IFFHS World's Best Goalkeeper
IFFHS World's Best Top Goal Scorer
IFFHS World's Best International Goal Scorer
IFFHS World Team
IFFHS World's Best Club Coach
IFFHS World's Best National Coach

References 

International Federation of Football History & Statistics
Association football trophies and awards
Association football player of the year awards